Magdy Atwa or Magdi Atwa is an Egyptian football midfielder. He currently plays for Al-Sekka Al-Hadid.

Career
Atwa was born in Fayoum and is one of 8 siblings. He claims his lifelong dream was to play for Zamalek, which became evident when he turned down offers from Al Ahly, Ismaily, and a number of European clubs to join Zamalek following his fine performances at ENPPI. Atwa scored 4 goals for Zamalek in 2006–07 Egyptian Premier League.

Honors

with Zamalek
Egyptian Cup (2008)

References

1983 births
Living people
Egyptian footballers
ENPPI SC players
Zamalek SC players
Tersana SC players
Eastern Company SC players
Egyptian Premier League players
People from Faiyum
Association football midfielders